FIBA EuroStars was an annual event, organized by FIBA Europe, as a showcase basketball game, from the 1996–97 season, until the 1999–2000 season. Commonly considered as the European equivalent of the NBA All-Star Game, the FIBA EuroStars game featured the season's best players, from both the European-wide top-tier level EuroLeague, and the European-wide 2nd-tier level FIBA Saporta Cup. Diversity was also paramount in the selection process, which aimed at allowing several different European basketball schools to be represented.FIBA EuroStars was the replacement All-European Team selection and all-star game of the original FIBA Festival  (1964–1995).

Format
The event held at the very end of the year and it last for four seasons. The FIBA EuroStars events were designed on the NBA All-Star Game pattern: a match between East and West. There was also a 3-point shootout contest. Players who played for championships on the east side of Europe (Greece, Turkey, Israel, ex-USSR and ex-Yugoslavia countries) were eligible for selection for the East regardless of the country of origins. On the hand, players who competed in countries on the west side of Europe (Spain, France, Germany, Italy etc) were eligible for selection for the West.The East stars defeated their West opponents on all four occasions.

List of games
Bold: Team that won the game.

Three Point Shootout Contest

1996 FIBA EuroStars - Istanbul, Turkey (1996–97 season)
Arena: Abdi İpekçi

Date: December 30, 1996

Season: 1996–97

Score: East 117 – West 114

EAST (Dusan Ivkovic): 
  David Rivers  (31, Point Guard 1.88 m,  Olympiacos)
  Panagiotis Fasoulas  (33, Center 2.13 m,  Olympiacos) 
  Petar Naumoski  (28, Point Guard 1.95 m,  Efes Pilsen)
  Nikos Oikonomou  (23, Power Forward 2.08 m,  Panathinaikos)
  Sergei Bazarevich  (31, Point Guard 1.91 m,  CSKA Moscow)
  Jure Zdovc  (30, Shooiting Guard 1.95 m)
  İbrahim Kutluay  (22, Shooting Guard 1.98 m,  Fenerbahçe)
  Peja Drobnjak  (21, Power Forward/Center 2.11 m,  Partizan)
  Randy White  (29, Power Forward 2.03 m,  Maccabi Tel Aviv)
  Evgeni Kisurin  (27, Power Forward 2.07 m,  Cibona)
  Orhun Ene  (29, Point Guard 1.88 m,  Ülker)

WEST (Lolo Sainz):
  Zoran Savić  (30, Power Forward/Center 2.08 m,  Kinder Bologna)
  Carlton Myers  (25, Shooting Guard 1.92 m,  Teamsystem Bologna)
  Željko Rebrača  (24, Center 2.13 m,  Benetton Treviso)
  Conrad McRae  (25, Power Forward/Center 2.11 m,  Teamsystem Bologna) 
  Walter Magnifico  (35, Center 2.09 m,  Kinder Bologna)
  Sašha Obradović  (27, Point Guard 1.97 m,  Alba Berlin)
  Marko Milič  (19, Forward 2.01 m,  Union Olimpija)
  Delaney Rudd  (34, Point Guard 1.88 m,  ASVEL)
  Yann Bonato  (24, Small Forward 2.02 m,  Limoges)
  Henning Harnisch  (28, Forward 2.03 m,  Alba Berlin)
  Ronny Bayer  (30, Point Guard 1.86 m,  Sunair Oostende)

Game MVP: David Rivers

3 Point Contest winner: Delaney Rudd (defeated Vasily Karasev in the final)

Top scorers: Zoran Savić (30 points), Nikos Oikonomou (25 points)

(Richard Dacoury, Dragan Tarlać, Antoine Rigaudeau and Georgios Sigalas were invited but they didn't play)

1997 FIBA EuroStars - Tel Aviv, Israel (1997–98 season)

Arena: Yad Eliyahu

Date: December 30, 1997

Season: 1997–98

Score: East 129 – West 107

EAST roster: Dino Rađja, Byron Scott, Artūras Karnišovas, Petar Naumoski, Sergei Bazarevich, Oded Kattash, Damir Mulaomerović, Rashard Griffith, Nikos Oikonomou, Peja Drobnjak, Gintaras Einikis, Nadav Henefeld. Coach: Dusan Ivkovic

WEST roster: Sasha Danilović, David Rivers, Antoine Rigaudeau, Zoran Savić, Sašha Đjorđjević, Gregor Fučka, Željko Rebrača, Vasily Karasev, Wendell Alexis, Alberto Herreros, Vladimir Stepania. Coach: Ettore Messina.

Game MVP: Artūras Karnišovas

3 Point Contest winner: Sašha Đjorđjević

Top scorers: Sašha Đjorđjević (23 points), Artūras Karnišovas (19 points)

(Dejan Bodiroga was invited but he didn't play)

1998 FIBA EuroStars - Berlin, Germany (1998–99 season)

Arena: Max Schmeling

Date: December 29, 1998

Season: 1998–99

Score: East 104 – West 98

EAST roster: Dejan Bodiroga, Dino Rađja, David Rivers, Petar Naumoski, Doron Sheffer, Conrad McRae, İbrahim Kutluay, Marko Milič, Nikos Oikonomou, Dragan Tarlać, Saulius Štombergas, Vasily Karasev. Coach: Stanislav Eremin.

WEST roster: Sasha Danilović, Artūras Karnišovas, Antoine Rigaudeau, Željko Rebrača, Carlton Myers, Rašho Nesterović, Wendell Alexis, Alberto Herreros, Andrea Meneghin, Henrik Rödl, Éric Struelens. Coach: Svetislav Pesic.

Game MVP: Carlton Myers

3 Point Contest winner: Carlton Myers (defeated Petar Naumoski in the final)

Top scorers: Carlton Myers (20 points), Sasha Danilović (19 points)

(Tanoka Beard was invited but he didn't play)

1999 FIBA EuroStars - Moscow, Russia (1999–2000 season)

Arena: Olimpiisky

Date: December 28, 1999

Season: 1999–2000

Score: East 112 – West 107

EAST roster: David Rivers, Dejan Bodiroga, Andrei Kirilenko, İbrahim Kutluay, Oded Kattash, Anthony Bowie, Dragan Tarlać, Jiří Zídek Jr., Vasily Karasev, Igor Kudelin. Coach: Alexander Gomelsky.

WEST roster: Tyus Edney, Artūras Karnišovas, Stojko Vranković, Gregor Fučka, Nikos Oikonomou, Marko Milič, Jim Bilba, Andrea Meneghin, Tanoka Beard, Alessandro Abbio. Coach: Carlo Recalcati.

Game MVP: Tyus Edney

3 Point Contest winner: İbrahim Kutluay

Top scorers: Artūras Karnišovas (29 points), Vasily Karasev (20 points), Tyus Edney (19 points), Dragan Tarlać (18 points), Dejan Bodiroga (18 points), Oded Kattash (16 points), Tanoka Beard (13 points), Andrei Kirilenko (10 points), Jiří Zídek Jr. (10 points), Nikos Oikonomou (9 points).

(Željko Rebrača, Dino Rađja, Carlton Myers and Antoine Rigaudeau were invited but they didn't play)

2000 FIBA EuroStars - Athens, Greece (2000–01 season)

Arena: Athens OACA

Date: December 27, 2000

Season: 2000-01

Score: East – West

The 2000 All-Star game was cancelled as the European basketball was at turmoil at the time, with two 1st tier competitions going on in the 2000-01 season, the FIBA SuproLeague and the ULEB Euroleague.

Players with multiple selections
Player nationalities by national team.

References

External links
Fibaeurope.com Archive

See also
FIBA All-Star Games
FIBA EuroCup All-Star Day

EuroLeague
European basketball awards
Defunct basketball competitions in Europe
International club basketball competitions
Recurring events disestablished in 1999
Recurring sporting events established in 1996
FIBA Saporta Cup
Basketball all-star games